The East Germany national football team was the national football team of the German Democratic Republic.  Following the realignment of UEFA's youth competitions in 1976, East Germany's Under-21 team was formed.  The team played until 1990, until East Germany ceased to be a separate country after the reunification of Germany. 

The team competed in the UEFA U-21 Championship.  Since the under-21 competition rules state that players must be 21 or under at the start of a two-year competition, technically it is an U-23 competition.   East Germany's record for the preceding U-23 competitions is also shown.

Before the 1990 merge, the East-German U-21 team was a little more successful than its Western counterpart, finishing second on three occasions.  The West German under-21s were runners-up once and quarter-finalists twice. 'East' failed to qualify seven times, whilst 'West' failed four times and didn't enter on three occasions.
The trainer of the under team was Walter Fritzsch, from 1978 until 1991.

UEFA U-23 Championship Record 
 1972: Did not qualify. Finished 3rd of 3 in qualification group.
 1974: Runners-up.
 1976: Did not qualify. Finished 2nd of 3 in qualification group.

UEFA U-21 Championship Record 
 1978: Runners-up.
 1980: Runners-up.
 1982: Did not qualify. Finished 3rd of 3 in qualification group.
 1984: Did not qualify. Finished 2nd of 4 in qualification group.
 1986: Did not qualify. Finished 3rd of 4 in qualification group.
 1988: Did not qualify. Finished 2nd of 4 in qualification group.
 1990: Did not qualify. Finished 2nd of 4 in qualification group.

See also 
 European Under-21 Football Championship

External links
 UEFA Under-21 website Contains full results archive
 The Rec.Sport.Soccer Statistics Foundation Contains full record of U-21/U-23 Championships.

European national under-21 association football teams
Under-21